The Trevorton Bridge was a wooden covered bridge that crossed the Susquehanna River. It was erected between Herndon in Northumberland County and Port Trevorton in Snyder County, Pennsylvania. It was originally built as a railroad bridge by the Trevorton and Susquehanna Railroad and, in 1858, the bridge was adapted for use as a road bridge as well as for trains. The bridge was most often used to cross the Susquehanna by cattle. The continuous crossing of cattle endangered the already weakened bridge (weakened from acid in the bark the pine used to construct the bridge). The bridge was eventually dismantled for fear that it would collapse.

See also
List of crossings of the Susquehanna River

References

Bridges over the Susquehanna River
Road bridges in Pennsylvania
Covered bridges in Pennsylvania
Covered bridges in Northumberland County, Pennsylvania
Covered bridges in Snyder County, Pennsylvania
Wooden bridges in Pennsylvania